Exposition Park is a former baseball ground located in Kansas City, Missouri, USA. The ground was home to the Kansas City Cowboys of the American Association for the 1888 and 1889 seasons.

It was located at 15th & Montgall from 1888 to 1902 in the 18th and Vine-Downtown East, Kansas City neighborhood.  It was on the grounds of the Kansas City exposition park which had opened in 1886 between 12th and 15th Street on Kansas Street—the center piece of which was an 80,000 square foot building modeled on The Crystal Palace until it was destroyed in 1901 in a fire that had occurred just a week after plans were announced to dismantle it.

The exact location and orientation of the ballpark, per Sanborn maps, was East 15th Street (now Truman Avenue) (south, first base); the imaginary line of Montgall Avenue (west, third base) + Prospect Avenue (farther west); the imaginary line of East 14th Street + Exposition Driving Park (north, left field); buildings and Kansas Avenue (east, right field).

The first football game between Kansas and Missouri was played here on October 31, 1891 (Kansas beat Missouri 22-8 before a crowd of about 3,000).

It was site of one of the first night games when the Kansas City Blues played the Sioux City Cornhuskers on August 28, 1894  --- an event in which the players dressed in costume.  The Cornhuskers were bought by Charles Comiskey following the 1894 season and eventually became the Chicago White Sox.

The stadium was also home to other Kansas City teams:

 Kansas City Maroons
 Kansas City Blues (American Association minor league baseball)

External links
Sanborn map showing the ballpark portion of the Exposition grounds, 1909

References

Sports venues in Missouri
Defunct baseball venues in the United States
Sports venues in Kansas City, Missouri
Defunct American football venues in the United States
Defunct minor league baseball venues
Defunct sports venues in Missouri